The Texas alligator lizard (Gerrhonotus infernalis) is a species of lizard in the subfamily Gerrhonotinae of the family Anguidae. The species is endemic to the central region of the American state of Texas, and south into adjacent northern Mexico.

Description
It is the largest lizard species in Texas, and one of the largest alligator lizards in the world. This lizard has a flat, wedge-shaped head. Its body is generally a yellow-brown color, often with darker brown and white checker patterning on its dorsal surfaces, and uniformly light-colored, white, or grey on its ventral surfaces. Its scales are very stiff and plate-like. It has short limbs, and a tail that can fall off to distract a potential predator, but will regrow in time.

Behavior
The Texas alligator lizard is a relatively slow, diurnal lizard, with quite good vision. Though not generally aggressive, it may bite if handled, and is incorrectly considered to be venomous by many cultures.

Habitat
G. infernalis is often found on rocky hillsides, where it hides among the stones or in limestone crevices.

Diet
The primary diet of G. infernalis is insects and other invertebrates, but it may sometimes prey on nestling birds or rodents.

Reproduction
Breeding occurs year-round; sometimes, multiple clutches of eggs are laid per year. Females will often stay near the nesting site to protect it, but no parental care occurs once the young alligator lizards hatch.

References

Further reading
Baird SF (1859). "Description of New Genera and Species of North American Lizards in the Museum of the Smithsonian Institution". Proceedings of the  Academy of Natural Sciences of Philadelphia 10: 253–256. (Gerrhonotus infernalis, new species, p. 255).
Behler JL, King FW (1979). The Audubon Society Field Guide to North American Reptiles and Amphibians. New York: Alfred A. Knopf. 743 pp. . (Gerrhonotus liocephalus infernalis, p. 541).
Conant R (1975). A Field Guide to Reptiles and Amphibians of Eastern and Central North America, Second Edition. Boston: Houghton Mifflin. xviii + 429 pp. + Plates 1-48.  (hardcover),  (paperback). (Gerrhonotus liocephalus infernalis, p. 134 + Plate 13 + Map 94).
Smith HM, Brodie ED Jr (1982). Reptiles of North America: A Guide to Field Identification. New York: Golden Press. 240 pp. . (Gerrhonotus liocephalus infernalis, pp. 88–89).
Zim HS, Smith HM (1956). Reptiles and Amphibians: A Guide to Familiar Species: A Golden Nature Guide. Revised Edition. New York: Simon and Schuster. 160 pp. (Gerrhonotus liocephalus [infernalis], pp. 66, 155).

External links
Herps of Texas: Gerrhonotus infernalis

Gerrhonotus
Reptiles of the United States
Reptiles of Mexico
Fauna of the Rio Grande valleys
Natural history of the Mexican Plateau
Reptiles described in 1859
Taxa named by Spencer Fullerton Baird